"Crash (Have Some Fun)" is a song by the group TKA from their 1990 second album Louder Than Love.  Michelle Visage performed vocals on the song. It was released in 1990 as the third single from the album by Tommy Boy Records. It was written by Frank De Wulf and Paul Lannoy and produced by Joey Gardner.

Track listing
US 12" Single/CD Maxi

Charts

References

1990 singles
TKA songs
1990 songs
Dance-pop songs
House music songs
Tommy Boy Records singles
Songs about music